Adrián Diéguez Grande (born 4 February 1996) is a Spanish footballer who plays as either a central defender or a left back for SD Ponferradina.

Club career
Born in Madrid, Diéguez represented RCD Carabanchel and Getafe CF as a youth. On 29 July 2015 he moved to neighbouring AD Alcorcón, being assigned to the reserves in Tercera División.

Diéguez made his senior debut on 30 August 2015, starting in a 2–2 away draw against CF Pozuelo de Alarcón. He scored his first goal as a senior the following 15 May, but in a 1–2 loss at AD Parla.

Diéguez played his first professional match on 8 September 2016, starting in a 1–0 Copa del Rey home win against former side Getafe. His Segunda División debut came sixteen days later, in a 1–1 away draw against Sevilla Atlético.

On 25 January 2017, Diéguez was loaned to Segunda División B side CF Fuenlabrada until June. On 4 July he moved to another reserve team, after agreeing to a four-year deal with Deportivo Alavés B, but joined the main squad in La Liga ahead of the pre-season.

Diéguez made his debut in the main category of Spanish football on 28 October 2017, starting in a 1–2 home loss against Valencia CF. On 31 January 2019, he moved to fellow top tier side SD Huesca on loan until the end of the season, and made his debut for the club on 9 February, in a 2–0 win against Girona FC.

On 28 July 2019, Diéguez returned to his first club Alcorcón, after agreeing to a one-year loan deal. On 15 September of the following year, he returned to Fuenla on a four-year contract, with the side now in the second division.

On 27 July 2022, after Fuenlabrada's relegation, Diéguez moved to SD Ponferradina still in the second division.

References

External links

1996 births
Living people
Footballers from Madrid
Spanish footballers
Association football defenders
La Liga players
Segunda División players
Segunda División B players
Tercera División players
AD Alcorcón B players
AD Alcorcón footballers
CF Fuenlabrada footballers
Deportivo Alavés B players
Deportivo Alavés players
SD Huesca footballers
SD Ponferradina players